Jablonov nad Turňou is a village and municipality in the Rožňava District in the Košice Region of middle-eastern Slovakia.

History
In historical records the village was first mentioned in 1235.

Geography
The village lies at an altitude of 280 metres and covers an area of 24.463 km².
It has a population of about 860 people.

Facilities
The village has a pharmacy and a doctors surgery. It also has a public library and a football pitch.

Genealogical resources

The records for genealogical research are available at the state archive "Statny Archiv in Kosice, Slovakia"

 Roman Catholic church records (births/marriages/deaths): 1889-1895 (parish A)
 Reformated church records (births/marriages/deaths): 1783-1830 (parish B)

See also
 List of municipalities and towns in Slovakia

External links
 Official website
 Jablonov nad Turňou
https://web.archive.org/web/20071027094149/http://www.statistics.sk/mosmis/eng/run.html
http://www.jablonovnt.ou.sk/
Surnames of living people in Jablonov nad Turnou

Villages and municipalities in Rožňava District